The United Nations Angola Verification Mission III was a peacekeeping mission that began operating in Angola in February 1995 during the civil war. It was established by the United Nations Security Council in Resolution 976, and concluded its mission in June 1997.

The Indian Army contributed to this UN mission by deploying one infantry battalion group (1000 personnel) and one engineers company group (200 personnel). There were a total of six infantry battalion groups operating in distinct regions of Angola, during this period (One each from India, Zimbabwe, Zambia, Brazil, Bangladesh, Uruguay and Romania). The mandate of the various Infantry Battalion groups was to ensure ceasefire between the Angolan Army and the UNITA rebels (who had control over more than half the country at that time), and then arrange for a safe "quartering" of these UNITA rebels once they laid down their arms. Subsequently, most of the arterial routes connecting major regions of the country were physically opened to traffic after de-mining them. The Indian Army initially sent 14 Punjab (Nabha Akal) as the infantry component and later replaced it with 16 Guards.

Upon its conclusion, the mission's total strength was 4,220 military personnel, comprising 283 military observers, 3,649 troops and 288 civilian police. Over the course of its two-year mission, UNAVEM III received 32 fatalities.

Financing
Method of financing	Assessments in respect of a Special Account
Actual and pro forma expenditures	From inception of mission through 31 December 1996: 752,215,900 net
Budget estimate from 1 July 1996 through 30 June 1997	134,980,800 net
Budget estimate from 1 July 1997 through 30 June 1998	No cost estimate was prepared in the expectation that the Security Council might authorize a follow-on mission as of 1 July 1997

UNAVEM III FORCE COMMANDERS
 Major-General Phillip Valerio Sibanda (Zimbabwe)
 October 1995 to date
 Major-General Chris Abutu Garuba (Nigeria)	February–September 1995

CONTRIBUTORS of personnel as of June 1997 ( end of mission)
 Bangladesh	205 troops; 10 military observers; 23 civilian police
 Brazil	739 troops; 20 military observers; 14 civilian police
 Bulgaria	10 military observers; 16 civilian police
 Congo	4 military observers
 Egypt	1 troop; 10 military observers; 14 civilian police
 France	15 troops; 7 military observers
 Guinea-Bissau	4 military observers; 4 civilian police
 Hungary	10 military observers; 7 civilian police
 India	452 troops; 20 military observers; 11 civilian police
 Jordan	2 troops; 17 military observers; 21 civilian police
 Kenya	10 military observers
 Malaysia	19 military observers; 20 civilian police
 Mali	9 military observers; 15 civilian police
 Namibia	199 troops
 Netherlands	2 troops; 14 military observers; 10 civilian police
 New Zealand	9 troops; 4 military observers
 Nigeria	19 military observers; 21 civilian police
 Norway	4 military observers
 Pakistan	14 military observers
 Poland	7 civilian police
 Portugal	313 troops; 6 military observers; 39 civilian police
 Romania	327 troops
 Russian Federation	151 troops; 7 civilian police
 Senegal	10 military observers
 Slovak Republic	5 military observers
 Sweden	19 military observers; 18 civilian police
 Tanzania	3 civilian police
 Ukraine	4 troops; 5 military observers
 Uruguay	7 troops; 3 military observers; 15 civilian police
 Zambia	509 troops; 10 military observers; 15 civilian police
 Zambia	700 troops; 20 military observers; 22 civilian police

See also
UNAVEM I
UNAVEM II

References

External links
United Nations Angola Verification Mission III website

United Nations operations in Angola
Military operations involving India
Organizations established in 1995
1995 in Africa
1995 in Angola